Rachel Leblanc-Bazinet (born 10 October 1988) is a Canadian weightlifter. She competed in the women's 53 kg event at the 2018 Commonwealth Games, winning the bronze medal. At the 2019 Pan American Games, Leblanc-Bazinet finished in fifth place in the 55 kg event.  In June 2021, Leblanc-Bazinet was named in Canada's Olympic team.

References

External links
 

1988 births
Living people
Canadian female weightlifters
Place of birth missing (living people)
Weightlifters at the 2018 Commonwealth Games
Commonwealth Games bronze medallists for Canada
Commonwealth Games medallists in weightlifting
Weightlifters at the 2019 Pan American Games
Pan American Games competitors for Canada
Weightlifters at the 2020 Summer Olympics
Olympic weightlifters of Canada
21st-century Canadian women
Weightlifters at the 2022 Commonwealth Games
Medallists at the 2018 Commonwealth Games